Calliostoma hassler, common name Hassler's top shell,  is a species of sea snail, a marine gastropod mollusk in the family Calliostomatidae.

Description
The size of the shell varies between 25 mm and 32 mm.

Distribution
This species occurs in the Atlantic Ocean off Eastern Brazil at depths between 40 m and 64 m.

References

 Clench, W. J. and C. G. Aguayo. 1939. Notes and descriptions of new deep-water Mollusca obtained by the Harvard-Havana Expedition off the coast of Cuba. II. Memorias de la Sociedad Cubana de Historia Natural "Felipe Poey" 13: 189–197, pls. 28-29

External links
 To Encyclopedia of Life
 To ITIS
 To World Register of Marine Species
 

hassler
Gastropods described in 1939